Narivaran-e Sharqi (also Romanized as Nārīvarān -e Sharqī) is a village in Sajjadrud Rural District, Bandpey-ye Sharqi District, Babol County, Mazandaran Province, Iran. At the 2006 census, its population was 1,155, in 280 families.

References 

Populated places in Babol County